Emiko Okuyama  (born June 23, 1951) is a Japanese politician. She served as the mayor of Sendai from 2009 to 2017.

Career 
Okuyama was born in Akita City, Japan on June 23, 1951. Her father was a public official, and when Okuyama was a child he would often take her around the country with him. After graduating from Tohoku University's economics department, she began working in the Sendai City town hall. She rose through many positions in the city government until being appointed the vice mayor in 2007.

In July 2009, Okuyama ran for Sendai City mayor with the support of the Democratic Party of Japan and the Social Democratic Party of Japan. She was the first woman to become elected mayor of a major Japanese city.

In the aftermath of the 2011 Tohoku earthquake and tsunami, Okuyama was recognized by the German Sustainability Award in 2012. She also has spoken before the United Nations about Sendai's disaster-recovery efforts and plans to increase the city's disaster preparedness.

Okuyama was re-elected on August 11, 2013, overcoming Tatsuya Kadono of the Japanese Communist Party. In 2017, Okuyama decided to retire, and chose not to run for office again. Although she had backed Hironori Sugahara in his campaign for the mayoral position, Kazuko Kori was elected the Mayor of Sendai instead.

References

External links 

 Emiko Okuyama official website
 City of Sendai official website

Living people
1951 births
People from Akita Prefecture
Tohoku University alumni
Women mayors of places in Japan
Mayors of Sendai
Pages with unreviewed translations